Vik is a municipality in Vestland county, Norway. It is located on the southern shore of the Sognefjorden in the traditional district of Sogn. The administrative center of Vik is the village of Vikøyri. Other villages in the municipality include Feios, Fresvik, Nese, and Vangsnes.

The  municipality is the 137th largest by area out of the 356 municipalities in Norway. Vik is the 249th most populous municipality in Norway with a population of 2,560.

General information

Vik was established as a municipality on 1 January 1838 (see formannskapsdistrikt law). The original municipality was identical to the Vik parish (prestegjeld) with the sub-parishes of Hopperstad, Hove, and Arnafjord (on the south side of the fjord) and Kvamsøy (on the north side of the fjord).

During the 1960s, there were many municipal mergers across Norway due to the work of the Schei Committee. On 1 January 1964 the sub-parish of Kvamsøy (population: 363) was transferred from Vik to Balestrand Municipality and the sub-parish of Vangsnes (population: 189) was transferred from Balestrand to Vik. Also on this date, the Nybø and Nygjerdet farms were transferred from Vik to Høyanger Municipality. All these changes gave Vik a total population of 2,623.

On 1 January 1992, the sub-parishes of Feios and Fresvik were transferred from Leikanger Municipality to Vik Municipality. This added 572 residents to the population of Vik.

On 1 January 2020, the municipality became part of the newly created Vestland county after Sogn og Fjordane and Hordaland counties were merged.

Name
The name is identical with the word vík which means inlet or cove, possibly referring to the small bay off the main Sognefjorden at the village of Vikøyri.

Coat of arms
The coat of arms was granted on 15 March 1991. It shows three gold knives for the cutting of leaves on a green background. These types of knives were commonly used in the area to cut fodder for animals.

Churches
The Church of Norway has five parishes within the municipality of Vik. It is part of the Sogn prosti (deanery) in the Diocese of Bjørgvin.

Government
All municipalities in Norway, including Vik, are responsible for primary education (through 10th grade), outpatient health services, senior citizen services, unemployment and other social services, zoning, economic development, and municipal roads. The municipality is governed by a municipal council of elected representatives, which in turn elect a mayor.  The municipality falls under the Sogn og Fjordane District Court and the Gulating Court of Appeal.

Municipal council
The municipal council  of Vik is made up of 17 representatives that are elected to four year terms. The party breakdown of the council is as follows:

Mayor
The mayor  of a municipality in Norway is a representative of the majority party of the municipal council who is elected to lead the council. The mayors of Vik (incomplete list):
2015–present: Olav Turvoll (Sp)
2007-2015: Marta Finden Halset (Ap)

History

The wide and fertile village of Vikøyri was established in ancient times. The area must have stood out early as a good place to settle. Distinct parts of Norway stand out with many large burial mounds. These are areas that have been powerful and rich and must have been political centers in prehistoric times. Vik is such an area.

Vik was a center in Sogn through a great deal of the Bronze and Iron Ages (1800 BC-1050 AD). This is due to the importance of agriculture in Vik.

Viking Age
The farms in Vik lie on old marine terraces, and many of the burial mounds lie on the edges of these. Several of the mounds carried rich finds that show how the people of Vik traded and travelled both domestically and abroad. Especially the burial fields at Stadheim and Hove have given rich finds. The Hove mounds were built about 400-500 AD. At Hopperstad, finds have been made that prove Viking raids from Vik. These finds are bronze bowls and bronze dishes, things that probably found their way to Norway with the Viking raids.

Old Churches
In the latter half of the 12th century the Hopperstad Stave Church was built at Hopperstad and the stone Hove Church was built at Hove. Both churches are now renovated and restored and they are used by villagers and tourists. The Hove Church was privately owned and indicates that Hove was the home of citizens of great wealth.

In addition to these churches there was also a stave church at Tenål. This church was destroyed in a landslide, probably in the 16th century. This church might also have been built in the 12th century.

The Middle Ages
Until the 18th century life passed on for centuries without major changes, in Vik as in other parts of Norway. The Black Death swept over the country and lay farms waste. People lived from what the earth, the mountains, and the fjord gave them. Agriculture kept people alive, forestry has never had a central place in the Vik economy. Few people lived far from the fjord.

18th century

In 1726, a military parade ground was established in Vik. This represents an important happening in the history of Vik. With the parade ground soldiers and officers found their way to Vik. When Vik became the drill ground for Sogns Bataljon in 1874, Vik's military days of glory began. The officers who came to Vik meant a lot for the development of the town. They were pioneers in agriculture and they were principal characters in politics. Other important happenings in the 18th century was the school building that was built already in 1741. The vicar Anders Daae built this house by his private means. This was one of the first school buildings in rural Norway. The house was torn down in the 1890s.

19th century
On 2 December 1811, disaster struck Vik. The village of Nese, on the shore of the Arnafjorden, was devastated by a landslide and 45 people died. The farms at Nese were gathered in one house cluster where the landslide came down from the mountain. The situation worsened by the bad crops in 1812. Surviving cost a lot of hard work, and many people were in need of help. But eventually a way out was offered. In 1839. the first people from Vik emigrated to America. Per Ivarson Undi with his wife and children became the first emigrants from Sogn og Fjordane county. Over the years, many would follow. Over 4,000 people left from the area of present-day Vik municipality. In the year 2000 there are less than 3000 inhabitants left in Vik. Tens of thousands of Americans can trace their roots to Vik municipality.

The latter part of the 19th century saw villagers gathering in common organizations and clubs, and official organizations were established. A post office was established in 1844, Vik Sparebank in 1846 and an agricultural organization in 1858. Then followed a rifle club, a temperance society, a morality society, a choral society, a consumer union, a youth society and many others. People created new social meeting places. The extensive shifting of agricultural land resulted in better working and living conditions. In 1865, Vik Prison was built in Vikøyri (the only prison in Sogn og Fjordane county). The dairy plant was established in 1897. The dairy is the only one that produces gammelost  (old cheese), and every year there is a Gammelost festival in Vik.

20th century
Power Plant
In 1913, the first power plant in Vik was finished. When the plant was opened it was immoderately labeled "the greatest happening in the development of Vik". The Vik people looked optimistically upon the future of industry and economic growth. In 1920, Vik saw its first industry when Vik Trevarefabrikk (wood articles) and Vik Hermetikkfabrikk (canned products) were established. The Trevarefabrikk employed between 10 and 20 persons, and the Hermetikkfabrikk employed 60 persons from May through September. Both companies have since gone out of business.

Rv13 across Vikjafjellet

In 1957, the Norwegian National Road 13 between the municipalities of Vik and Voss (across the Vikjafjellet mountain) was officially opened. This was the first (and only) road connection to Vik from the rest of Norway, without any ferry or boat across the fjord. There are several regular ferry connections across the fjord.

Industry
From the late 1960s until 1990, agriculture in Vik was revolutionized. New land was cultivated and new farm buildings were built. When the last power project was finished, a great effort was made to establish new employment in Vik. The effort resulted in success, and Vik Verk opened in 1968. The company produced crash barriers, signposts, snow shields, and other aluminium products. About 220 persons were employed. Since then, the company has been split into several minor companies, and the total employment is a lot less today.

Geography

Vik is located on the southern shores of the Sognefjorden and west of the Aurlandsfjorden. The municipality is bordered on the west by the municipalities of Høyanger and Modalen, to the south by Voss and Vaksdal, and to the east by Aurland. Across the Sognefjorden to the north and east lie the municipalities of Sogndal and Lærdal.

The lake Holskardvatnet is located in the southwest part of the municipality. The Fresvikbreen glacier is located between the villages of Fresvik and Vikøyri.

Attractions
UNESCO World Heritage Site
The "West Norwegian Fjords of Geirangerfjord and Nærøyfjord" were added to UNESCO's World Heritage List in 2005. The World Heritage Site possesses a unique combination of glacial landforms at the same time as each area is characterised by its own outstanding beauty. The Nærøyfjord areas in this site stretch through the municipalities of Aurland, Lærdal, Vik, and Voss.

Vikøyri
The name Vikøyri describes the area between the rivers Vikja and Hopra. The last syllable of the name is the Norwegian word describing the flat area of land at the mouth of a river. The settlement lies on the Øyri, which was created by sediments deposited over thousands of years. Vikøyri was common land, owned by the local community, which might be the reason why the community grew so rapidly. During the 19th century an increasing number of people took up trade. 

Hopperstad Stave Church
The Hopperstad Stave Church was built around 1130. It is a triple-nave stave church and has a Gothic altar-baldaquin with sculptured heads, as well as decorations and paintings in the ceiling depicting the childhood of Christ. This stave church was saved from demolition on the initiative of the architect Peter Andreas Blix.

The Stave churches are constructions of high quality, richly decorated with carvings. In virtually all of them the door frames are decorated from top to bottom with carvings. This tradition of rich ornamentation appears to go back to the animal carvings of the Viking Age. The dragons are lovingly executed and transformed into long-limbed creatures of fantasy, here and there entwined with tendrils of vine, with winding stems and serrated leaves. The elaborate designs are executed with supreme artistic skill. The stave church doorways are, therefore, among the most distinctive works of art to be found in Norway. However, it is difficult to connect them with the Christian gospel.

Statue of Fridtjof
The Statue of Fridtjof from Frithjof's Saga is a landmark which towers  over the hilltop. The statue was a gift from Kaiser Wilhelm II, to the Norwegian people and was erected in July 1913. It stands in a beautiful park overlooking the Sognefjorden at Vangsnes.

Borgstova
Borgstova is a house built in 1790. It is the only remnant of the Sjøtun Estate, which covered almost the entire village of Vikøyri. At Borgstova, there are copies of relics from the oldest burial sites in Vik.

Kristianhus Boat and Engine Collection
The museum is located by the fjord at the centre of Vikøyri in the same building as the tourist office. Here you can experience what historic boatlife was like for the inhabitants along the Sognefjord.

Vik Ski Festival
The Ski Festival is arranged at Vikafjellet (Vik Mountain) at the end of May. There are competitions in ski jumping, slalom skiing, cross-country skiing, and Telemark skiing. Public parties and cultural arrangements are organized in connection with the ski festival.

Birdlife
Situated on the Sognfjord the municipality of Vik is known for its mild climate and great scenery. Take a hike on Vikafjellet and you could see such species as Eurasian golden plover or in good rodent years, maybe a rough-legged buzzard. The woodlands hold the usual passerines depending if it is coniferous or deciduous. Along the fjords red-breasted merganser can be seen all year round while the call of the Eurasian oystercatcher can only be heard from spring through early autumn.

Notable people 

 Ludvig Daae (1723–1786) a Norwegian priest and landowner
 Christen Christensen (1826–1900) military officer and politician; Mayor of Vik in 1850's & 1860's
 Edvard Liljedahl (1845-1924) a farmer, politician and Govt. minister 
 Anders Nummedal (1867–1944) an archaeologist and academic; discovered the Fosna culture
 Sverre Riisnæs (1897-1988) a jurist and public prosecutor; member of the Nasjonal Samling government
 Kåre Norvald Lerum (born 1939) wealthy businessperson and politician, Mayor of Sogndal 1978 to 1982
 Solveig Kloppen (born 1971) a journalist, actress and TV hostess; grew up in Vik 
 Gustav Valsvik (born 1993) a footballer with 250 club caps and 6 for Norway

References

External links
Municipal fact sheet from Statistics Norway 
Official Website of Vik 
Vikjavev.no

 
Municipalities of Vestland
1838 establishments in Norway